Sjötulls BK is a Swedish football club located in Gävle in Gävleborg County.

Background
Sjötulls Bollklubb were founded in 2002 and played their first season in the Swedish football league in 2003 in Division 6 Gästrikland where they finished in a creditable 7th place. Since their inaugural season the club have made good progress and have been promoted three times, the most recent success being winning Division 4 Gästrikland in 2010.

Since their foundation Sjötulls BK has participated mainly in the lower divisions of the Swedish football league system.  The club currently plays in Division 3 Södra Norrland which is the fifth tier of Swedish football. They play their home matches at the Träffen in Gävle.

Sjötulls BK are affiliated to Gestriklands Fotbollförbund.

Recent history
In recent seasons Sjötulls BK have competed in the following divisions:

2011 – Division III, Södra Norrland
2010 – Division IV, Gästrikland
2009 – Division IV, Gästrikland
2008 – Division IV, Gästrikland
2007 – Division V, Gästrikland
2006 – Division VI, Gästrikland
2005 – Division VI, Gästrikland
2004 – Division VI, Gästrikland
2003 – Division VI, Gästrikland

Attendances

In recent seasons Sjötulls BK have had the following average attendances:

Footnotes

External links
 Sjötulls BK – Official website
 Sjötulls BK on Facebook

Football clubs in Gävleborg County
Association football clubs established in 2002
2002 establishments in Sweden